Texcatepec is a municipality located in the north zone in the State of Veracruz, about 190 km from state capital Xalapa. It has a surface of 153.61 km2. In 1930 the municipal head-board  was established in the village of Amexac; but for the decree number 4 in 1931 returned the character of municipal head-board, to the village of Texcatepec.

Geographic Limits

The municipality of  Texcatepec  is delimited to the north by Zontecomatlán de López y Fuentes to the east by Tlachichilco, to the south by Zacualpan and to the west by Huayacocotla. It is watered by small creeks that are tributaries of the river Vinasco, tributary in turn of the Tuxpan.

Agriculture

It produces principally maize, beans, sugarcane,  and coffee.

Celebrations

In  Texcatepec , in June takes place the celebration in honor to San Juan Bautista, Patron of the town, and in December takes place the celebration in honor to Virgen de Guadalupe.

Weather

The weather in  Texcatepec  is very cold and wet all year with rains in summer and autumn.

References

External links 

  Municipal Official webpage
  Municipal Official Information

Municipalities of Veracruz